Who Dares Wins (The National Lottery: Who Dares Wins during National Lottery draws) is a BBC game show broadcast on BBC One which began on 17 November 2007 and ended on 7 September 2019.  The programme is hosted by Nick Knowles and is based on Fox's short-lived American game show The Rich List. From 2007 until 2016 it was a BBC National Lottery game show.

Format
Two teams of two members each, who have never met before, are placed in separate soundproof pods. The audio to each pod can be turned on or off as needed during the game, either isolating a team or allowing them to hear and be heard.

The subject for a list is announced to both teams (e.g. "20th Century Oscar-Nominated Films," "Highest-Grossing Authors in the United Kingdom"), followed by a brief explanation of what constitutes a valid answer. The teams then take turns bidding on how many correct answers they think they can give. A team's pod is turned on only when it is their turn to bid, and they are told of the opposing team's current bid. The bidding ends when one team dares the other to play the list, whereupon both pods are turned on. If the high bidders can give their stated number of correct answers without a miss, they win the list; otherwise, the opponents win it. The first team to win two lists takes/retains the championship and advances to the bonus round.

Tiebreaker
If each team wins one of the first two lists, a penalty shootout tiebreaker is played. A new list subject is announced, both pods are turned on, and the teams alternate giving one answer at a time. If both teams answer correctly or both miss, they each take another turn; when only one team answers correctly, they win the game.

Bonus round (The Money List)
The champions are given a new list subject and can win money by giving up to 15 correct answers, as follows:

After every third correct answer, the team may choose to quit the round and bank their winnings. An incorrect answer at any time ends the round and forfeits the accumulated money (money won on previous money lists is safe). After 15 correct answers, the team banks the full £50,000 and the round automatically ends.

There is no limit on the number of games or amount of money that a team can win. All winnings are split equally between the teammates.

Three champion teams chose to leave the show instead of continuing. In each case, the next game was played with two new teams.

Records
The most games won by a team is 12 by Chrissy from Blackrod and Joe from Canterbury.

Trish McGowan and Seamus Hussein have won the most money (£170,000). They won 8 times.

Chrissy and Joe are second in terms of winnings, with £165,000 in 12 games, while Nat Moitt and Euan Fleming are third in terms of winnings, with £155,000 in 7 games; they also held the record for the most answers given on a single list, with 40 (for Chemical Elements), until series 7 episode 5 where Hayley and Ranjit managed to name a 52 word list (the words in Bohemian Rhapsody).

Transmissions

References

External links

2007 British television series debuts
2019 British television series endings
2000s British game shows
2010s British game shows
BBC Scotland television shows
BBC television game shows
British game shows about lotteries
Television series by ITV Studios
English-language television shows